Ingenius (Welsh: Owain map Morydd) is a legendary king of the Britons as recounted by Geoffrey of Monmouth's pseudohistorical work Historia Regum Britanniae (The History of the Kings of Britain), written c. 1138 CE. Ingenius was the fourth son of King Morvidus and the brother of Gorbonianus, Archgallo, Elidurus, and Peredurus.

Following the return of Elidurus to the kingship of Britain, Ingenius joined with his brother Peredurus and attacked their older brother. They succeeded in capturing him and locked him in a guarded tower in Trinovantum. Instead of fighting over who ruled the island, they split the island, giving Cornwall to Ingenius and Albany to Peredurus.  He ruled his portion of the island for seven years then died, giving the whole of the island to his brother, Peredurus. His son Idvallo would later become king of Britain.

References

Legendary British kings
3rd-century BC rulers